The Church of Jesus Christ of Latter-day Saints in Guyana refers to the Church of Jesus Christ of Latter-day Saints (LDS Church) and its members in Guyana. The first branch (small congregation) was organized in Georgetown, Guyana in 1980. In 2019, there were 6,264 members in 11 congregations.

History 

The first missionaries entered Guyana was as senior missionary couple, Benjamin and Ruth Hudson, who arrived on August 19, 1988. Sacrament meeting was held the next month which included the Abdulla family who was previously baptized in Canada. The first convert, Luanna Abdulla, was baptized on October 23, 1988. The church was legally recognized in February 1989 and a branch in Georgetown was organized the following month. 23 members attended branch meetings when it was organized. 45 were in attendance in February 1990 when Elder M. Russell Ballard dedicated and blessed the land for missionary work. Greater numbers of missionaries were assigned to Guyana over the years following the dedication. Seminary and institute commenced in the mid-1990s.  President Desmond Hoyte was a special guest at a luncheon on September 15, 1992 that was hosted by Elder Stephen D. Nadauld of the Seventy and the Trinidad Tobago Mission president.

In 2000, the first branch outside of Georgetown was organized in New Amsterdam. On 15 March 2003, the first meetinghouse was dedicated in Prashad Nagar, with 250 members present. On December 21, 2003, the Georgetown Guyana District was organized. In 2009, Linden became the first city in the interior to open for missionary work.

In September 2009, the Guyanese government requested the Church to remove foreign missionaries who were claimed to have expired missionary visas. Missionaries reported that they were incarcerated for one day due to alleged visa violations. The Guyanese government enforced a new limit on the number of foreign missionaries able to serve in Guyana to around twenty. Later that month, the Church withdrew about forty of the sixty missionaries serving in Guyana. Local members were provided with the opportunity to serve as full-time missionary companions in order to keep proselyting areas open, but this approach was not sustained. Government officials expressed concerns that the Church had a larger missionary force than most Christian churches in Guyana notwithstanding the comparatively small number of Latter-day Saints in the country. 

Interweave Solutions partnered with The Church of Jesus Christ of Latter-Day Saints in 2014 to provide business training to its members in Guyana. After measurable success the First Lady of Guyana made it a key part of her office's agenda. In 2016, Elder Dale G. Renlund attended a district conference in Georgetown. In 2017, the First Lady, Mrs. Sandra Granger spoke to the youth at their youth conference on July 1, 2017, encouraging them to embrace education and instill moral values.

Humanitarian Efforts
The Church has conducted 170 humanitarian and development projects in Guyana since 1988. Most of these projects have been community projects although emergency response, maternal and newborn care, refugee response, vision care, and wheelchair donations have been provided. In 2011, a senior missionary couple was assigned to Georgetown to help the unemployed find sustainable employment. Between 2007 and 2012, the value of church humanitarian aid projects was US$18,047,345. In May 2019, Close to $1 Million US dollars in food was given to Guyana's Civil Defence Commission (CDC). In May 2020, the Civil Defense Commission (CDC) received $20Million worth of food and hygienic supplies from the Church of Jesus Christ of Latter-day Saints to assist those affected by COVID-19.

Districts and Congregations 
As of February 2023, Guyana had the following districts and congregations:

Berbice Guyana District
Corriverton Branch
East Canje Branch (FHC)
New Amsterdam Branch
Rose Hall Branch
Rosignol Branch

Georgetown Guyana District
Demerara Branch
Diamond Branch
Garden Park Branch
Georgetown Branch (FHC)
La Grange Branch (FHC)
Linden Branch (FHC)
Tuschen Branch

All branches has its own meetinghouse. Congregations in a district are called branches, regardless of size.

District Centers (District offices) are located at the East Canje Branch and La Grange Branch Buildings. 

Family History Centers (FHC) are located at East Canje Branch, Georgetown Branch, La Grange Branch, and Linden Branch buildings.

An Employment Resources Center is located in a Georgetown meetinghouse.

Missions
In 1988, formal missionary work started in Port of Spain under the direction of the West Indies Mission in September 1983. Guyana was assigned to the Trinidad Tobago Mission when it was created 1 July 1991, and was reassigned to the West Indies Mission upon the closure of the Trinidad and Tobago Mission in 1994. The Barbados Bridgetown Mission was created in 2015 and was later renamed the Trinidad Port of Spain Mission.

Temples
There are no temples in Guyana. Guyana is currently located within the Manaus Brazil Temple District.

See also

Religion in Guyana

References

External links
 The Church of Jesus Christ of Latter-day Saints - Caribbean Area - Official Site
 The Church of Jesus Christ of Latter-day Saints - Newsroom (Caribbean)
 ComeUntoChrist.org Latter-day Saints Visitor site
 History of the Church in Guyana - David R. Crockett
Missionary Couple - Harold and Margene Severson

 
Christianity in Guyana